The Wakulla River is an  river in Wakulla County, Florida. Its drainage basin extends northwest into Leon County, including Munson Slough, and may extend as far north as the Georgia border.

The river, due to its clear, clean water, was once used to film underwater scenes during north Florida's cinema boom. Movies filmed in Wakulla Springs and river include several Tarzan movies, starring Johnny Weissmuller, and Creature from the Black Lagoon.

Etymology
The name Wakulla is from Guacara.  Guacara is a Spanish phonetic spelling of an original Indian name, and Wakulla is a Muskhogean pronunciation of Guacara.  The Spanish Gua is the equivalent of the Creek wa, and as the Creek alphabet does not exhibit an "R" sound, the second element cara would have been pronounced kala by the Creeks.  The Creek voiceless "L" is always substituted for the Spanish "R".  Thus the word Guacara was pronounced Wakala by the Seminoles who are Muskhogean in their origin and language. In the 17th century the Spanish also used the name "Guacara River" for what is now called the Suwannee River. Boyd et al. suggest that the common name of the two rivers is related to the fact that both are the products of solution topography, and that both are fed by springs.

Since Wakulla was probably a Timucuan word, it is unlikely that its meaning will ever be known.  It may contain the word kala which signified a "spring of water" in some Indian dialects, but not in the Timucuan language. Timucuan cala meant "to cut or shave", "to freeze to death", or "fruit".

Navigation 
Access to the river north of the Upper Bridge is blocked by a chain-link fence erected by Ed Ball in the 1930s; challenged in court, its legality was upheld when the river above it was found by a court to be non-navigable.

List of crossings

Notes

References 
Boyd, Mark F., Hale G. Smith and John W. Griffin. (1999). Here they once stood: the tragic end of the Apalachee missions. University Press of Florida 
Granberry, Julian. (1993). A Grammar and Dictionary of the Timucua Language. Third Edition. The University of Alabama Press. 
Marth, Del and Marty Marth, eds. 1990. The Rivers of Florida. Sarasota, Florida: Pineapple Press, Inc. . P. 96.
Milanich, Jerald T. (2006). Laboring in the Fields of the Lord: Spanish Missions and Southeastern Indians. University Press of Florida. 
Wenhold, Lucy L. Translator and Ed. (1936). "A 17th Century Letter of Gabriel Diaz Vara Calderón, Bishop of Cuba, Describing the Indians and Indian Missions of Florida." Smithsonian Miscellaneous Collections, Vol. 95, No. 16. Reprinted in David Hurst Thomas. Ed. (1991). Spanish Borderlands Sourcebooks 23 The Missions of Spanish Florida. Garland Publishing.

External links

Rivers of Florida
Rivers of Wakulla County, Florida
Outstanding Florida Waters